Thanisandra railway station (station code: THSA) is an railway station in Bangalore, India, which used to serve Thanisandra locality. Only two passenger services can halt here

References

See also 
 Bengaluru Commuter Rail

Railway stations in Bangalore
Bangalore railway division
Railway stations in Karnataka